Drew Brown may refer to:

 Drew Bundini Brown (1928–1987), American boxing trainer of Muhammad Ali, and occasional film actor
 Drew Brown (musician) (born 1984), American musician, member of OneRepublic
 Drew Brown (American football) (born 1995), Canadian gridiron football kicker

See also
Andrew Brown (disambiguation)